The Akure Ofosu Forest Reserve is situated in South West, Nigeria, and covers .

Akure Ofosu is of great importance for the conservation of the chimpanzee population in Nigeria. Research conducted during 2007 found 33 nests at four locations, without direct vision.

History 
Established in 1936 and comprising some 400 square kilometers (154 square miles), Akure-Ofosu Forest Reserve also borders the Ala, Owo, Ohosu and '/;], together forming one of the largest areas of forest remaining in Nigeria. The forests contained within are home to many different species, including threatened primates. Red-capped mangabeys (Cercocebus torquatus), Nigerian white-throated guenons (Cercopithecus erythrogaster pococki), putty-nosed monkeys (Cercopithecus nictitans), mona monkeys (Cercopithecus mona), and others can all be found in what remains of Akure-Ofosu’s forests.

Chimpanzee Conservation in Akure-Ofosu Forest Reserve

References

Forest Reserves of Nigeria
Nigerian lowland forests